Rhonex Kipruto (born 12 October 1999) is a Kenyan long-distance runner. He won the bronze medal in the 10,000 metres at the 2019 World Athletics Championships. Kipruto is the world record holder for the 10 km road race with a time of 26:24, set on 12 January 2020 in Valencia Spain.

He was the 10,000 m 2018 World Under-20 champion.

Career
Rhonex Kipruto's parents are farmers. He grew up in Kombatich and his coach is Colm O'Connell.

2017
Kipruto finished third in the 10 kilometres at the Prague Grand Prix with a time of 27:13.

2018
On 10 February, he placed second in the junior men's run at the Kenyan National Cross Country Championships. The 8 km race was won by Stanley Waithaka in 22:09.2 while Kipruto clocked22:30.3. The following month on 17 March, he participated in the African Cross Country Championships U20 race in Algeria. He won the 8 km run in 25:01, five seconds ahead of Stanley Waithaka. Kipruto won the UAE Healthy Kidney 10 km in Central Park, New York City, U.S. on 29 April. While Leonard Komon's (10k world record holder) 2011 course record was 27:35 Kipruto finished in 27:08, the fastest 10k on a record-eligible course on US soil.

He went to the IAAF World U20 Championships held in Tampere, Finland from 10 to 15 July. On 10 July, he won the 10,000 metres title with a time of 27:21.08, a new championship record. Jacob Kiplimo of Uganda (The 2017 U20 cross country world champion) placed second 22 seconds behind and Berihu Aregawi of Ethiopia came in third with 27:48.41.

On 8 September, Kipruto ran in his third 10k race the second-fastest time in history (behind the Leonard Komon's world record of 26:44 from 2010) with his winning time of 26:46 in Prague. Geoffrey Koech came in second in 27:18, and Mathew Kimeli finished ranked third in 27:26.

2019
Kipruto won the IAAF Cross Country Permit in Elgoibar on 13. January in a time of 32:05.

On 23 February, he placed sixth in the men's senior 10 km race race at the Kenyan Cross Country Championships in Eldoret, finishing 18 seconds behind Amos Kirui's winning time of 29:51.

Kipruto ran in the men's senior race at the 2019 IAAF World Cross Country Championships in Aarhus, Denmark. He finished sixth in a time of 32:17 out of 144 starters. The run was won by Joshua Cheptegei (Uganda) in 31:40 and Jacob Kiplimo placed second in 31:44. However, Kipruto won the silver medal in the team ranking with Kenya behind Uganda and ahead of Ethiopia.

On 4 July, Kipruto won the 10 km Peachtree Road Race in Atlanta, Georgia, USA with a time of 27:01, breaking the previous course record and setting the all-comers' record (best performance on country's soil). The Association of Road Racing Statisticians describes this race as "Acceptable for ranking, no record quality...". The former course record was set in 1996 with a time of 27:04 by Joseph Kimani. Kipruto's brother Bravin Kiptoo placed second with a time of 27:29, and Kennedy Kimutai finished third place with 27:54.

At the Kenyan National Championships on 21 August, Kipruto placed second in the 10,000 m in a time of 27:26.34. The race was won by Geoffrey Kamworor in a time of 27:24.76.

2019 IAAF World Championships in Doha, Qatar
On 6 October 2019, Kipruto raced the 10,000 m. The winner was Joshua Cheptegei (Uganda) in 26:48.36, the runner up was Yomif Kejelcha (Ethiopia) in 26:49.34. Kipruto took the bronze medal in 26:50.32.

2020–present
On 12 January 2020, Kipruto set a 10 km road race world record in Valencia with a time of 26:24. The former world record had been set by Joshua Cheptegei in Valencia on 1 December 2019 with 26:38. In the world record race Benard Kimeli (Kenya) came in second after Kipruto with 27:12 and Julien Wanders of Switzerland finished third place in 27:13, a new European record. Kipruto covered the first half in 13:18 and the second one in 13:06. Wanders improved on his own European record by 12 seconds.

Peronal bests

Information taken from World Athletics profile.

References

External links

 

1999 births
Living people
Kenyan male long-distance runners
Kenyan male steeplechase runners
World Athletics Championships athletes for Kenya
World Athletics Championships medalists
World Athletics U20 Championships winners
Athletes (track and field) at the 2020 Summer Olympics
Olympic athletes of Kenya